The 2019 Daytona 500, the 61st running of the event, was a Monster Energy NASCAR Cup Series race held on February 17, 2019, Contested over 207 laps—extended from 200 laps due to an overtime finish, on the  asphalt superspeedway.  After three multiple cars crash in the last 20 laps (including the Big One on lap 191 which involved 21 cars), only 19 of the 40 cars were running at the end of the race and only 14 completed every lap. It was the first race of the 2019 Monster Energy NASCAR Cup Series season, and also marked the debut of the Ford Mustang, which Ford brought in as a replacement for the Fusion. This race was the final career start for Casey Mears. 2016 winner Denny Hamlin held off teammate Kyle Busch over the final laps to win his second Daytona 500 in four years.

This Daytona 500 was the first not to feature the Earnhardt name in the starting lineup since 1978.

Report
Daytona International Speedway is a race track in Daytona Beach, Florida, that is one of two superspeedways, the other being Talladega Superspeedway.

Background

Daytona International Speedway is one of two superspeedways to hold NASCAR races, the other being Talladega Superspeedway. The track's turns are banked at 31 degrees, while the front stretch, the location of the finish line, is banked at 18 degrees.

Entry list

Practice

First practice (February 9)

Second practice (February 9)

Qualifying

Qualifying results

Gander RV Duel

The Gander RV Duels are a pair of NASCAR Monster Energy Cup Series races held in conjunction with the Daytona 500 annually in February at Daytona International Speedway. They consist of two races 60 laps and 150 miles (240 km) in length, which serve as heat races that set the lineup for the Daytona 500. The first race sets the lineup for cars that qualified in odd-numbered positions on pole qualifying day, while the second race sets the lineup for cars that qualified in even-numbered positions. The Duels set the lineup for positions 3–38, while positions 39 and 40 are filled by the two "Open" (teams without a charter) cars that set the fastest times in qualifying, but did not lock in a spot in the Duels.

For championship purposes, each Duel is a full Championship Stage, except there is no playoff point awarded. The top ten drivers receive championship points.

Duel 1

Duel 1 results

Duel 2

Duel 2 results

Starting lineup

Practice (post–Duels)

Third practice (February 15)

Fourth practice (February 15)

Final practice (February 16)

Race
New England Patriots wide receiver Julian Edelman and Houston Texans linebacker J. J. Watt each had duties before the race. Watt, the race’s grand marshal, became the first NFL player to give “drivers, start your engines” in race history. Edelman was the race’s honorary starter – something several current and former NFL players have done in year’s past – as Edelman waved the green flag to signal the start of the 500. “I think these guys are absolutely insane,” Edelman, the MVP at Super Bowl LIII earlier that month, said before the race. “First and foremost, they’re going 200 miles an hour around for three hours straight and (are) able to focus in extreme conditions.”

Matt DiBenedetto was the biggest surprise during the race. DiBenedetto started 9th in the race and led the most laps with 49 laps led. Unfortunately for DiBenedetto, his race would come to an end. With Kyle Busch now leading during a race restart with 10 laps to go, DiBenedetto was getting a push by Paul Menard into turn 3 when Menard bumped DiBenedetto a little bit too hard and turned DiBenedetto around triggering a 21 car crash in turn 3. DiBenedetto and Menard collected Erik Jones, Ryan Blaney, Matt Tifft, Daniel Suarez, Austin Dillon, Ryan Newman, Aric Almirola, David Ragan, Ricky Stenhouse Jr., Ryan Preece, Chris Buescher, Daniel Hemric, Martin Truex Jr., Chase Elliott, Jimmie Johnson, William Byron, Ty Dillon, Joey Logano, and Kyle Larson. NASCAR threw the red flag to clean up the mess. The race restarted with 6 laps to go but another caution would be thrown for a 7 car wreck. It started when Ricky Stenhouse Jr. got turned by Kevin Harvick and into Kyle Larson with Harvick spinning collecting Chase Elliott, Alex Bowman, Ty Dillon, and Brad Keselowski. During the wreck, Ryan Preece went to the bottom and went through in between 2 spinning cars in Stenhouse and Elliott and Preece made it through the wreck. The race restarted with 2 laps to go and it was a battle for the lead between Denny Hamlin and Kyle Busch. But on the backstretch, the final caution flew for an 8 car crash. Clint Bowyer got a run to the inside of Michael McDowell and made it 3 wide and tried to go up in front of McDowell but instead he went across McDowell's nose and collected William Byron, Chase Elliott, Landon Cassill, Jamie McMurray, Brad Keselowski, and Brendan Gaughan. The wreck would set up an overtime finish. On the restart, Hamlin got in front of Busch and Hamlin held off the pack to win his 2nd Daytona 500 trophy. Kyle Busch, Erik Jones, Joey Logano, and Michael McDowell rounded out the top 5 while Ty Dillon, Kyle Larson, Ryan Preece, Jimmie Johnson, and Ross Chastain rounded out the top 10.

Race results

Stage Results
Stage One
Laps: 60

Stage Two

Laps: 60

Final Stage Results

Laps: 80

Race statistics
 Lead changes: 15 among 9 different drivers
 Cautions/Laps: 12 for 47
 Red flags: 2 for 39 minutes and 38 seconds
 Time of race: 3 hours, 45 minutes and 55 seconds
 Average speed:

Media

Television

Since 2001—with the exception of 2002, 2004 and 2006—the Daytona 500 has been carried by Fox in the United States. The booth crew consisted of longtime NASCAR lap-by-lap announcer Mike Joy, three–time Daytona 500 champion Jeff Gordon, and for the final time 1989 race winner Darrell Waltrip. Pit road was manned by Jamie Little, Regan Smith, Vince Welch and Matt Yocum.

Spanish-language network Fox Sports LA aired the race live, with lap-by-lap announcer Jessi Losada and color analyst Rodolfo Landeros.

Radio
The race was broadcast on radio by the Motor Racing Network—who has covered the Daytona 500 since 1970—and simulcast on Sirius XM NASCAR Radio. The booth crew was consisted of Alex Hayden, Jeff Striegle and 1989 Cup Series champion Rusty Wallace. Longtime turn announcer Dave Moody was the lead turn announcer. He called the Daytona 500 from atop the Sunoco tower outside the exit of turn 2 when the field raced through turns 1 and 2. Mike Bagley worked the backstretch for the Daytona 500 from a spotter's stand on the inside of the track & Kyle Rickey called the Daytona 500 when the field raced through turns 3 and 4 from the Sunoco tower outside the exit of turn 4. On pit road, MRN was manned by lead pit reporter and NASCAR Hall of Fame Executive Director Winston Kelley. He will be joined on pit road by Steve Post, Kim Coon, and Dillon Welch.

Standings after the race

Drivers' Championship standings

Manufacturers' Championship standings

Note: Only the first 16 positions are included for the driver standings.

References

2019 Monster Energy NASCAR Cup Series
2019 in sports in Florida
February 2019 sports events in the United States
NASCAR races at Daytona International Speedway